Lord Stratford may refer to:
Stratford Canning, 1st Viscount Stratford de Redcliffe (1786–1880), British diplomat and politician
Tony Banks, Baron Stratford (1942–2006), British Labour politician